The Foster County Courthouse in Carrington, North Dakota was built in 1909.  It was designed by architects Buechner & Orth in Beaux Arts style.  It was listed on the National Register of Historic Places in 1980.  The listing includes two contributing buildings.

The listing includes the courthouse and also a sheriff's residence/jail building to its north, which is a two-story brick building.

References

Courthouses on the National Register of Historic Places in North Dakota
County courthouses in North Dakota
Beaux-Arts architecture in North Dakota
Government buildings completed in 1909
National Register of Historic Places in Foster County, North Dakota
1909 establishments in North Dakota